CrowdStrike Holdings, Inc. is an American cybersecurity technology company based in Austin, Texas. It provides cloud workload and endpoint security, threat intelligence, and cyberattack response services. The company has been involved in investigations of several high-profile cyberattacks, including the 2014 Sony Pictures hack, the 2015–16 cyber attacks on the Democratic National Committee (DNC), and the 2016 email leak involving the DNC.

History
CrowdStrike was co-founded by George Kurtz (CEO), Dmitri Alperovitch (former CTO), and Gregg Marston (CFO, retired) in 2011. In 2012, Shawn Henry, a former Federal Bureau of Investigation (FBI) official, was hired to lead the subsidiary CrowdStrike Services, Inc., which focused on proactive and incident response services. In June 2013, the company launched its first product, CrowdStrike Falcon, which provided endpoint protection, threat intelligence and attribution. 

In May 2014, CrowdStrike's reports assisted the United States Department of Justice in charging five Chinese military hackers for economic cyber espionage against United States corporations. CrowdStrike also uncovered the activities of Energetic Bear, a group connected to the Russian Federation that conducted intelligence operations against global targets, primarily in the energy sector.

After the Sony Pictures hack, CrowdStrike uncovered evidence implicating the government of North Korea and demonstrated how the attack was carried out. In 2014, CrowdStrike played a major role in identifying members of Putter Panda, the state-sponsored Chinese group of hackers also known as PLA Unit 61486.

In May 2015, the company released information about VENOM, a critical flaw in an open-source hypervisor called Quick Emulator (QEMU), that allowed attackers to access sensitive personal information. In October 2015, CrowdStrike announced that it had identified Chinese hackers attacking technology and pharmaceutical companies around the time that US President Barack Obama and China's Paramount leader Xi Jinping publicly agreed not to conduct economic espionage against each other. The alleged hacking would have been in violation of that agreement.

CrowdStrike released research in 2017 showing that 66 percent of the attacks the company responded to that year were fileless or malware-free. The company also compiled data on the average time needed to detect an attack and the percentage of attacks detected by organizations.

In February 2018, CrowdStrike reported that, in November and December 2017, it had observed a credential harvesting operation in the international sporting sector, with possible links to the cyberattack on the opening ceremonies of the Winter Olympics in Pyeongchang. That same month, CrowdStrike released research showing that 39 percent of all attacks observed by the company were malware-free intrusions. The company also named which industries attackers most frequently targeted. That March, the company released a version of Falcon for mobile devices and launched the CrowdStrike store.

In January 2019, CrowdStrike published research reporting that Ryuk ransomware had accumulated more than $3.7 million in cryptocurrency payments since it first appeared in August.

According to CrowdStrike's 2018 Global Threat Report, Russia has the fastest cybercriminals in the world. The company also claimed that, of 81 named state-sponsored actors it tracked in 2018, at least 28 conducted active operations throughout the year, with China being responsible for more than 25 percent of sophisticated attacks.

In September 2020, CrowdStrike acquired zero trust and conditional access technology provider Preempt Security for $96 million.

In March 2021, CrowdStrike acquired Danish log management platform Humio for $400 million. Official CrowdStrike releases noted that the acquisition is to further their XDR capability.

In November 2021, CrowdStrike acquired SecureCircle for $61 million, a SaaS-based cybersecurity service that extends Zero Trust security to data on, from and to the endpoint.

In December 2021, CrowdStrike moved its headquarters location from Sunnyvale, California to Austin, Texas.

In March 2023, CrowdStrike released the ninth annual edition of the cybersecurity leader’s seminal report citing surge in global identity thefts.

Funding 
In July 2015, Google invested in the company's Series C funding round, which was followed by Series D and Series E, raising a total of $480 million as of May 2019. In 2017, the company reached a valuation of more than $1 billion with an estimated annual revenue of $100 million. In June 2018, the company said it was valued at more than $3 billion. Investors include Telstra, March Capital Partners, Rackspace, Accel Partners and Warburg Pincus.

In June 2019, the company made an initial public offering (IPO) on the NASDAQ.

Russian hacking investigations
CrowdStrike helped investigate the Democratic National Committee cyber attacks and a connection to Russian intelligence services. On March 20, 2017, James Comey testified before congress stating, "CrowdStrike, Mandiant, and ThreatConnect review[ed] the evidence of the hack and conclude[d] with high certainty that it was the work of APT 28 and APT 29 who are known to be Russian intelligence services."

In December 2016, CrowdStrike released a report stating that Russian government-affiliated group Fancy Bear had hacked a Ukrainian artillery app. They concluded that Russia had used the hack to cause large losses to Ukrainian artillery units.  The app (called ArtOS) is installed on tablet PCs and used for fire-control. CrowdStrike also found a hacked variation of POPR-D30 being distributed on Ukrainian military forums that utilized an X-Agent implant.

The International Institute for Strategic Studies rejected CrowdStrike's assessment that claimed hacking caused losses to Ukrainian artillery units, saying that their data on Ukrainian D30 howitzer losses was misused in CrowdStrike's report. The Ukrainian Ministry of Defense also rejected the CrowdStrike report, stating that actual artillery losses were much smaller than what was reported by CrowdStrike and were not associated with Russian hacking.

Cybersecurity firm SecureWorks discovered a list of email addresses targeted by Fancy Bear in phishing attacks.  The list included the email address of Yaroslav Sherstyuk, the developer of ArtOS. Additional Associated Press research supports CrowdStrike's conclusions about Fancy Bear. Radio Free Europe notes that the AP report "lends some credence to the original CrowdStrike report, showing that the app had, in fact, been targeted."

In the Trump–Ukraine scandal, a transcript of a conversation between Donald Trump, the former president of the United States, and Volodymyr Zelensky, the president of Ukraine, had Trump asking Zelensky to look into CrowdStrike.

Recognition
 2021 AWS Global Public Sector Partner Award for best cybersecurity solution
 2021 Canada AWS Partner Award as the ISV Partner of the Year
 2021 Ranked #1 for Modern Endpoint Security 2020 Market Shares in IDC’s Worldwide Corporate Endpoint Security Market Shares, 2020 Report

See also
 Timeline of Russian interference in the 2016 United States elections
 Timeline of investigations into Trump and Russia (January–June 2017)

References

External links
 
 

Companies based in Austin, Texas
American companies established in 2011
Technology companies established in 2011
Computer security companies
Security companies of the United States
2011 establishments in California
Organizations associated with Russian interference in the 2016 United States elections
2019 initial public offerings
Companies listed on the Nasdaq
Internet technology companies of the United States
Trump–Ukraine scandal